Linsey Corbin (born February 16, 1981) is an American triathlete who races primarily in non-drafting, long-distance events. Her career includes a third place at the 2011 Ironman 70.3 World Championship and eight Ironman race wins.

Career
Corbin was born Linsey Pickell to parents Tom and Betty in Greenbrae, California, and grew up in Bend, Oregon, where she attended Mountain View High School. Corbin participated downhill ski racing, cross country and track & field. She attended UC Davis where she ran track but eventually took a break from the sport while attending college. She transferred to the University of Montana to study nutrition and exercise physiology in 2000. In Montana, Corbin began competing in triathlon and in 2003 she entered Missoula's Grizzly Triathlon and won. Three years later she set a course record for her age group at the 2006 Wildflower Triathlon. She soon after turned pro.

In 2014, after living in Missoula and working with coach Matt Dixon of Purple Patch Fitness, Corbin made changes to her approach to training and season preparation. She moved back to her home town of Bend, Oregon for the opportunity to train around more elite athletes. She also switched coaches, to Jesse Kropelnicki of QT2 Systems. In 2015, Corbin planned to race at the Ironman African Championships in March, but she was unable to start after falling ill. Blood tests later revealed that she had contracted viral and bacterial infections. After some recovery time she took 10th place at the Ironman 70.3 North American Championship in St. George in May. She attempted to race the Ironman North American Championship later that month; however, a pulled hip flexor kept her from racing. Later tests would reveal that she had a small stress fracture in her femur. The injury and the recovery time needed to heal effectively ended her 2015 season causing her to miss the Ironman World Championship for the first time since 2005.

Corbin announced that the 2022 Ironman World Championship would be her final race as a professional.

Results
Corbin's notable achievements include:
2008: Ironman World Championships - 5th
2009: Ironman Arizona - 2nd
2010: Ironman Arizona - 2nd
2010: Ironman Coeur d’Alene - 1st
2011: Ironman 70.3 World Championships - 3rd
2011: Ironman 70.3 Pucón - 1st
2011: Ironman Arizona - 2nd
2012: Wildflower Triathlon - 2nd
2012: Ironman 70.3 Hawai'i - 1st
2012: Ironman 70.3 Puerto Rico - 2nd
2012: Ironman Arizona - 1st
2012: Ironman Austria - 1st
2013: Ironman 70.3 Mont Tremblant - 1st 
2014: Ironman 70.3 Raleigh - 2nd
2014: Ironman Austria - 1st
2014: Ironman Los Cabos - 1st
2015: Ironman 70.3 St. George - 10th
2016: Ironman 70.3 Pan American Championships - 5th
2017: Ironman Canada - 1st
2018: Ironman Wisconsin - 1st
2019: Ironman 70.3 Traverse City - 2nd
2019: Ironman Wisconsin - 1st
2021: Ironman Coeur D’Alene - 3rd
2022: Ironman Des Moines North America Championship - 5th

References

External links

1981 births
Living people
Sportspeople from Missoula, Montana
American female triathletes
Sportspeople from Bend, Oregon
University of Montana alumni
People from Greenbrae, California
Sportspeople from California
21st-century American women